Brenden Thenhaus (born August 5, 1986) is a Canadian lacrosse player for the Toronto Rock in the National Lacrosse League.

Professional career
Thenhaus began his National Lacrosse League career with the Buffalo Bandits in the 2007 NLL season.  He was acquired by the Wings as a free agent prior to the 2008 NLL season. Thenhaus scored his first career goal while with the Bandits against the Wings.  On February 28, 2008, Thenhaus was traded to the Edmonton Rush in exchange for a second round pick in the 2008 National Lacrosse League entry draft. Thenhaus joined the Boston Blazers for their inaugural season during the 2009 NLL season. After two seasons in Boston, Thenhaus was acquired by the Buffalo Bandits in the Blazers' dispersal draft. He played one year in Buffalo before being signed to a contract by the Toronto Rock.

Canadian Box career
In 2006, Thenhaus led the OLA Junior B Lacrosse League in scoring and won the Founders Cup National Title as a member of the Oakville Buzz.
Thenhaus was drafted in the first round (second overall) in the 2008 Major Series Lacrosse Draft by the Brampton Excelsiors.

Hockey career
Thenhaus also played ice hockey with Burlington Cougars of the Ontario Provincial Junior A Hockey League.

Statistics

NLL
Reference:

References

1986 births
Living people
Boston Blazers players
Buffalo Bandits players
Canadian lacrosse players
Edmonton Rush players
Philadelphia Wings players
Toronto Rock players